Penweathers is a hamlet in west Cornwall, England, United Kingdom. It is situated approximately one mile (1.6 km) west of Truro city centre.

See also

Carrine Common & Penwethers

References

Hamlets in Cornwall